Phylidorea is a genus of crane flies in the family Limoniidae.

Species
 Subgenus Macrolabina Savchenko, 1986
P. alexanderi (Stary, 1974)
P. latistyla Savchenko, 1986
P. nigronotata (Siebke, 1870)
P. pernigrita (Alexander, 1938)
P. temelskin Podenas and Gelhaus, 2001
 Subgenus Paraphylidorea Savchenko, 1986
P. fulvocostalis (Coquillett, 1899)
P. fulvonervosa (Schummel, 1829)
 Subgenus Phylidorea Bigot, 1854
P. abdominalis (Staeger, 1840)
P. bicolor (Meigen, 1804)
P. celaena (Alexander, 1970)
P. costalis (Santos Abreu, 1923)
P. ferruginea (Meigen, 1818)
P. gracilistyla Savchenko, 1973
P. heterogyna (Bergroth, 1913)
P. hokkaidensis (Alexander, 1947)
P. kuwayamai (Alexander, 1925)
P. longicornis (Schummel, 1829)
P. melanommata (Alexander, 1921)
P. melanura (Lackschewitz, 1964)
P. modesta (Lackschewitz, 1964)
P. multidentata (Alexander, 1938)
P. mundella (Alexander, 1931)
P. nervosa (Schummel, 1829)
P. squalens (Zetterstedt, 1838)
P. subpoetica (Alexander, 1924)
P. umbrarum (Krogerus, 1937)
P. yamamotoi (Alexander, 1936)

References

Limoniidae
Tipuloidea genera